The 2010 UST Growling Tigers men's basketball team represented University of Santo Tomas in the 73rd season of the University Athletic Association of the Philippines. The men's basketball tournament for the school year 2010-11 began on July 10, 2010 and the host school for the season was De La Salle University.

UST finished seventh at the end of the double round-robin eliminations. They won four games against ten losses, giving head coach Pido Jarencio his worst win–loss record in the UAAP.

They had an average winning margin of 3.0 points and an average losing margin of 7.7 points.

Two of their games went into overtime. The first was an 87–81 win over the UP Fighting Maroons in the first round, and the other was a 76–81 double-overtime loss to the Adamson Falcons in the second round.

The Tigers tied Adamson's 2008 record of most three-point shots made in a game which they did twice, both in the first round. They made 16 three-point shots in their overtime win against UP and then repeated the feat against Adamson for a 55.2 field goal percentage.

Roster

Depth chart

Roster changes 
The Growling Tigers have lost Season 72 MVP and scoring leader Dylan Ababou as well as Khasim Mirza and Allein Maliksi to graduation, while Tiger Cubs and incoming college freshmen Kyle Neypes and Cedric Labing-isa, both of whom were shoo-ins to the UST Senior team decided to join the rival NU Bulldogs.

This year's roster includes Season 72 Rookie of the Year Jeric Teng, three-point specialists Jeric Fortuna and Tata Bautista, and big man Chris Camus among a handful of veterans. Nearly half of the roster are rookies with Ilocos Norte standout Ed Daquioag who was a former high school teammate of Bautista and Cebuano guard Pipoy Marata, who was named NBTC's Most Outstanding Player leading the pack.

Subtractions

Additions

Schedule and results

Preseason tournaments 
In October 2009, speculations that head coach Pido Jarencio had been fired began to surface. This was related to the past unsuccessful seasons that followed their 2006 championship. Manila Bulletin had written an article about it on October 5, but the school's Institute of Physical Education and Athletics officials, namely Director Fr. Ermito de Sagon and Assistant Director Mrs. Felicitas Francisco were quick to dismiss them as rumors. Jarencio's live contract will expire in March 2010 and from then officials will make an assessment of his tenure. The coach himself dismissed the rumor during an interview in July. He had confirmed receiving offers from the NU Bulldogs, but also said that he "never thought of leaving UST unless they didn't want him there anymore."

Jarencio's contract was extended to December 2010.

According to Jarencio, "UST did not join the major preseason games for fear that it would affect the morale of the players." Another reason for skipping the summer tournaments, was the problems that they encountered in recruiting players. UST Tiger Cubs standouts Neypes and Labing-isa have decided to play for National University after graduation and are currently undergoing residency. Neypes was actually included in the Bulldogs' roster when they competed in the 2010 Filoil Preseason Cup.

UAAP games 

Elimination games were played in a double round-robin format. All games were aired on Studio 23 and Balls.

UAAP statistics 

|- bgcolor=#ffffdd
| Jeric Teng || 14 || || 29.4 || 63 || 173 || 36.4% || 26 || 77 || 33.8% || 29 || 42 || 69.0% || 4.3 || 1.9 || 0.8 || 0.1 || 2.7 || style=|12.9
|-
| Tata Bautista || 14 || || 21.1 || 47 || 131 || 35.9% || 40 || 111 || 36.0% || 22 || 30 || 73.3% || 1.3 || 1.2 || 0.6 || 0.1 || 1.3 || 11.1
|- bgcolor=#ffffdd
| Jeric Fortuna || 14 || || style=|33.2 || 55 || 157 || 35.0% || 22 || 66 || 33.3% || 13 || 18 || 72.2% || 3.6 || style=|4.7 || style=|1.1 || 0.1 || 3.1 || 10.4
|-
| Chris Camus || 14 || || 31.7 || 56 || 141 || 39.7% || 4 || 18 || 22.2% || 14 || 33 || 42.4% || style=|8.9 || 1.6 || style=|1.1 || style=|0.7 || 1.9 || 9.3
|- bgcolor=#ffffdd
| Melo Afuang || 14 || || 24.9 || 47 || 102 || 46.1% || 1 || 7 || 14.3% || 22 || 31 || 71.0% || 6.4 || 0.8 || 0.6 || 0.4 || 2.1 || 8.4
|-
| Aljon Mariano || 14 || || 19.4 || 42 || 87 || 48.3% || 14 || 28 || style=|50.0% || 10 || 19 || 52.6% || 3.0 || 0.9 || 0.2 || 0.4 || 1.9 || 7.7
|- bgcolor=#ffffdd
| Paolo Pe || 14 || || 21.1 || 21 || 51 || 41.2% || 0 || 1 || 0.0% || 5 || 15 || 33.3% || 3.7 || 0.4 || 0.2 || 0.4 || 1.2 || 3.3
|-
| Ed Daquioag || 14 || || 9.2 || 14 || 36 || 38.9% || 4 || 17 || 23.5% || 6 || 12 || 50.0% || 1.4 || 0.9 || 0.6 || 0.0 || 0.9 || 2.7
|- bgcolor=#ffffdd
| Eddie Aytona || 12 || || 4.8 || 3 || 12 || 25.0% || 0 || 2 || 0.0% || 2 || 2 || style=|100.0% || 0.3 || 0.1 || 0.0 || 0.0 || 0.5 || 0.7
|-
| Pipoy Marata || 6 || || 2.8 || 2 || 3 || style=|66.7% || 0 || 0 || 0.0% || 0 || 0 || 0.0% || 0.3 || 0.0 || 0.0 || 0.0 || 0.8 || 0.7
|- bgcolor=#ffffdd
| Kenneth Mamaril || 12 || || 2.7 || 2 || 3 || style=|66.7% || 0 || 0 || 0.0% || 0 || 0 || 0.0% || 0.6 || 0.8 || 0.0 || 0.2 || 0.5 || 0.3
|-
| Vince Tinte || 8 || || 2.9 || 1 || 2 || 50.0% || 0 || 0 || 0.0% || 0 || 0 || 0.0% || 0.8 || 0.1 || 0.0 || 0.1 || 0.0 || 0.3
|- bgcolor=#ffffdd
| Kim Lo || 11 || || 4.2 || 0 || 7 || 0.0% || 0 || 0 || 0.0% || 0 || 0 || 0.0% || 0.6 || 0.4 || 0.0 || 0.1 || 0.2 || 0.0
|-
| Jackson Wong || 8 || || 2.4 || 0 || 0 || 0.0% || 0 || 0 || 0.0% || 0 || 0 || 0.0% || 0.4 || 0.0 || 0.0 || 0.0 || 0.9 || 0.0
|- bgcolor=#ffffdd
| AC Marquez || 5 || || 4.0 || 0 || 3 || 0.0% || 0 || 0 || 0.0% || 0 || 0 || 0.0% || 0.6 || 0.0 || 0.0 || 0.0 || 0.0 || 0.0
|- class=sortbottom
! Total || 14 ||  || 41.1 || 353 || 908 || 38.9% || 111 || 327 || 33.9% || 123 || 200 || 61.5% || 34.9 || 12.8 || 5.3 || 2.5 || 16.9 || 67.1
|- class=sortbottom
! Opponents || 14 ||  || 41.1 || 369 || 865 || 42.6% || 66 || 253 || 26.1% || 189 || 307 || 61.6% || 38.7 || 15.6 || 5.6 || 3.8 || 16.7 || 71.0
|}

Source: inboundPASS

Aftermath 
Because the Growling Tigers did not participate in any major preseason tournaments, they were not scouted by the other UAAP schools and were able to pull off wins early in the first round of eliminations. They were even third in the standings at 3–2 at one point late in the first round.

Like the other UST Growling Tigers teams, the 2010 squad had heavily relied on their three-point shooting, and when their shots had failed to connect, the losses began to pile up, mostly on double-digit deficits.

According to head coach Pido Jarencio, this team was more of a stop-gap in preparation for the university's quadricentennial celebration. "Some of the players I recruited are really made for 2011." One of the players that he was referring to was incoming Cameroonian rookie Karim Abdul who had undergone a one year residency and will be able to suit up for the Tigers next season to beef up the team's short front line.

Jarencio who has a deep pool of players from the Team B training team, has plans for a major revamp on the current team. "If nothing happens (to UST) next year, I will exit the team," added the coach.

References 

UST Growling Tigers basketball team seasons